
Year 877 (DCCCLXXVII) was a common year starting on Tuesday (link will display the full calendar) of the Julian calendar.

Events 
 By place 

 Europe 
 Summer – King Charles II ("the Bald") sets out for Italy, accompanied by his wife Richilde and a number of his chief vassals. He gives orders for an expedition, but Duke Boso (his brother-in-law) refuses to join the army. At the same time Carloman, son of Louis the German, has crossed the Alps into eastern Lombardy at the head of a Frankish army. Charles sends Richilde back to Gaul, for the coronation as empress of the Holy Roman Empire, and with orders for reinforcements. However, the Frankish aristocracy is more concerned with the attacks by the Vikings in their country, than the war with the Saracens in southern Italy. Pope John VIII receives Charles at Vercelli, where he requests help against the attacks by the Saracens in southern Italy. He forms an alliance with the Italian states at Traetto.
 August – Siege of Syracuse: The Aghlabids begin raiding the Byzantine territories, in the east of the island of Sicily. They besiege Syracuse, and blockade the fortress city by sea and land. 
 October 6 – Charles II dies while crossing the pass of Mont Cenis at Brides-les-Bains, en route back to Gaul. He is succeeded by his son Louis the Stammerer, king of Aquitaine, who becomes ruler of the West Frankish Kingdom. Carloman, forced by an epidemic which breaks out in his army, returns to Germany. After the death of his father, Louis makes plans to receive the oath of fidelity from his subjects, but he learns that the magnates are refusing him obedience and rallying around Boso. The rebels are supported by his stepmother Richilda, and, as a sign of their displeasure, ravage the country. Hincmar, archbishop of Reims, intercedes and the rebels agree to a settlement. The magnates, whose rights Louis promises to recognize, all make their submissions. 
 December 8 – Louis the Stammerer is crowned by Hincmar as king (not emperor) of the West Frankish Kingdom, in the church of Compiègne. The imperial throne will remain vacant until 881.

 Britain 
 Autumn – King Alfred the Great raises a large force, and marches on the Viking camp at the city of Exeter. His army besieges the Great Summer Army, led by  Guthrum, and forces the Vikings to surrender. They flee north to Gloucester, and settle in the Five Boroughs (modern East Midlands).
 Battle of Strangford Lough: King Halfdan I leaves for Ireland, in an attempt to claim the Kingdom of Dublin from his rival Bárid mac Ímair. He is killed in battle at Strangford Lough, and a probable interregnum follows in York.
 Ceolwulf II is installed as puppet king of Mercia. The west of the kingdom comes under Ceolwulf's rule, while in the east the Five Boroughs begin as fortified Danish burhs.
 The Vikings invade Wales once more, and King Rhodri ap Merfyn ("the Great") of Gwynedd, Powys and Seisyllwg is forced to flee to Ireland (approximate date).
 King Constantin I is killed fighting Viking raiders, at the "Black Cave" in Fife. He is succeeded by his brother Áed mac Cináeda as ruler of Alba (Scotland).

 Asia 
 King Jayavarman III dies after a 42-year reign. He is succeeded by his cousin Indravarman I, as ruler of the Khmer Empire (modern Cambodia).

 By topic 
 Religion 
 October 23 – Photius I is reinstated as patriarch of Constantinople, after the death of Ignatius.

Births 
 January 31 – Wang Kon, founder of Goryeo (d. 943)
 September 10 – Eutychius, patriarch of Alexandria (d. 940)
 Ælfthryth, English princess and countess of Flanders (d. 929)
 Fujiwara no Kanesuke, Japanese nobleman (d. 933)
 Liu, Chinese empress of Qi (d. 943)
 Luo Shaowei, Chinese warlord (d. 910)
 Pi Guangye, Chinese chancellor (d. 943)
 Rudesind I, bishop of Mondoñedo (d. 907)
 Wang Rong, Chinese warlord (d. 921)

Deaths 
 August 5 – Ubayd Allah ibn Yahya ibn Khaqan, Abbasid vizier 
 October 6 – Charles the Bald, Holy Roman emperor (b. 823)
 October 23 – Ignatius, patriarch of Constantinople  
 Andrew the Scot, Irish archdeacon (approximate date) 
 Bernard II, Frankish nobleman (approximate date)  
 Carloman, Frankish abbot (approximate date)    
 Constantine I, king of Alba (Scotland)
 Engelram, Frankish chamberlain 
 Gérard II, Frankish nobleman (or 879)
 Halfdan Ragnarsson, Viking leader and 'king' of Northumbria
 Jayavarman III, king of the Khmer Empire (Cambodia)
 Johannes Scotus Eriugena, Irish theologian (approximate date)
 Musa ibn Bugha al-Kabir, Abbasid general
 Ōe no Otondo, Japanese scholar (b. 811)
 Savaric I, bishop of Mondoñedo (b. 866)
 Wang Ying, Chinese rebel leader

References